Hugh Morris (19 November 1900 – 1965) was a Scottish footballer who played as an outside right for Clyde, Manchester City, Nottingham Forest, Notts County, Southend United and Newport County.

References

1900 births
1965 deaths
Date of death unknown
Association football outside forwards
Scottish footballers
Sportspeople from East Renfrewshire
Clyde F.C. players
Rutherglen Glencairn F.C. players
Manchester City F.C. players
Nottingham Forest F.C. players
Notts County F.C. players
Newport County A.F.C. players
Southend United F.C. players
Scottish Junior Football Association players
Scottish Football League players
English Football League players